The Motorsport Association of Pakistan (MAP) is the National Sporting Authority (ASN) for the governance of auto racing in Pakistan under the International Sporting Code of the FIA. The Association is a member of the Fédération Internationale de l'Automobile (FIA).

MAP organises different motor sports events in Pakistan, such as Cholistan Desert Jeep Rally, Gwadar Rally, autoshows, Faisalabad drag racing 
A1 Team Pakistan is also regulated by MAP.

References

External links
 Official Website

National sporting authorities of the FIA
Sports governing bodies in Pakistan
Motorsport in Pakistan